During the 1994–95 English football season, Aston Villa competed in the FA Premier League, League Cup, FA Cup and the UEFA Cup.

Two seasons earlier, Aston Villa narrowly missed out on the league title. The season after that, they dipped to 10th place in the league but still had success as League Cup winners. But the decline continued into 1994–95 and Ron Atkinson paid with his job in November. Within days, former Villa favourite Brian Little was back at the club. Little managed to keep Villa clear of the drop.

Before the season was over, a new era was already in the making at Villa Park. A number of players now past their best were off-loaded to new clubs; these included Ray Houghton, Garry Parker, Kevin Richardson and Earl Barrett. The close season saw more players from the Atkinson era pass through the Villa Park exit door: Shaun Teale, Dalian Atkinson, Dean Saunders and John Fashanu. Little brought in younger players like Mark Draper, Ian Taylor, Savo Milosevic, Nii Lamptey, Carl Tiler, Gary Charles and Alan Wright to give some much-needed strength to a side of fading stars, as well as giving such much-needed hope to fans of a club which had been rescued from the threat of a rapid decline.

Final league table

Results summary

Results by matchday

Results
Aston Villa's score comes first

Legend

FA Premier League

FA Cup

League Cup

UEFA Cup

Players

First-team squad
Squad at end of season

Left club during season

Reserve squad
The following players made most of their appearances this season for the reserves, and did not appear for the first-team, or only appeared for the first-team in friendlies.

Youth squad
The following players spent most of the season playing for the youth team, and did not appear for the first team, but may have appeared for the reserve team.

Trainees
The following players were signed to Aston Villa as trainees, and did not appear for the youth or reserve teams this season.

Schoolboys
The following players were signed to Aston Villa as associated schoolboys, and did not appear for the youth or reserve teams this season.

Transfers

In

Out

Transfers in:  £6,700,000
Transfers out:  £6,700,000
Total spending: £0

Awards
 January: Manager of the Month, Brian Little

Notes

References

External links
Aston Villa official website
avfchistory.co.uk 1994–95 season

Aston Villa F.C. seasons
Aston Villa